Cantrainea nuda is a species of sea snail, a marine gastropod mollusk in the family Colloniidae.

Description

Distribution

References

External links

Colloniidae
Gastropods described in 2001